Botrylloides is a genus of ascidian tunicates in the family Styelidae.

Description
Like Botryllus, Botrylloides are flat sheets of organisms which can be found covering ropes, boat hulls, horseshoe crabs, seaweeds, and any still or slow-moving object in saltwater. Also both are considered to be invasive Ascidians, found in many ports around the world. Invasive tunicates such as these, Didemnum sp., and Styela clava are a problem for shellfish and other marine life populations, and cause fouling of boats and piers.

Species within the genus Botrylloides include:
 Botrylloides anceps (Herdman, 1891) 
 Botrylloides aureum (Sars, 1851) 
 Botrylloides chevalense Herdman, 1906 
 Botrylloides diegensis Ritter & Forsyth, 1917 
 Botrylloides fuscus Saito & Watanabe, 1985 
 Botrylloides giganteum (PÈrËs, 1949) 
 Botrylloides israeliense Brunetti, 2009 
 Botrylloides leachii (Savigny, 1816) 
 Botrylloides lenis Saito & Watanabe, 1985 
 Botrylloides lentus Saito & Watanabe, 1985 
 Botrylloides magnicoecum (Hartmeyer, 1912) 
 Botrylloides nigrum Herdman, 1886 
 Botrylloides perspicuus (Herdman, 1886) 
 Botrylloides pizoni Brunetti & Mastrototaro, 2012 
 Botrylloides saccus Kott, 2003 
 Botrylloides simodensis Saito & Watanabe, 1981 
 Botrylloides superbum (Drasche, 1883) 
 Botrylloides tyreum Herdman, 1886 
 Botrylloides violaceus Oka, 1927

Species names currently considered to be synonyms:
 Botrylloides albicans Milne Edwards, 1841: synonym of Botrylloides leachii (Savigny, 1816) 
 Botrylloides aurantium Oka, 1927: synonym of Botryllus aurantius (Oka, 1927) 
 Botrylloides aurea Sars, 1851: synonym of Botrylloides aureum (Sars, 1851) 
 Botrylloides boloniense Giard, 1875: synonym of Botrylloides leachii (Savigny, 1816) 
 Botrylloides carnosum Oka, 1927: synonym of Botrylloides violaceus Oka, 1927 
 Botrylloides chazaliei Sluiter, 1898: synonym of Botrylloides nigrum Herdman, 1886 
 Botrylloides clavelina Giard, 1872: synonym of Botrylloides leachii (Savigny, 1816) 
 Botrylloides cyanescens Giard, 1888: synonym of Botrylloides leachii (Savigny, 1816) 
 Botrylloides diegense Ritter & Forsyth, 1917: synonym of Botrylloides diegensis Ritter & Forsyth, 1917 
 Botrylloides eligulatum Beniaminson, 1975: synonym of Botryllus tuberatus Ritter & Forsyth, 1917 
 Botrylloides fulgurale Herdman, 1886: synonym of Botrylloides leachii (Savigny, 1816) 
 Botrylloides gregalis Sluiter, 1898: synonym of Botryllus gregalis (Sluiter, 1898) 
 Botrylloides insigne Giard, 1872: synonym of Botrylloides leachii (Savigny, 1816) 
 Botrylloides lateritium Beniaminson, 1975: synonym of Botrylloides violaceus Oka, 1927 
 Botrylloides leachi (Savigny, 1816): synonym of Botrylloides leachii (Savigny, 1816) 
 Botrylloides leptum Herdman, 1899: synonym of Botrylloides leachii (Savigny, 1816) 
 Botrylloides maeandrium Sluiter, 1898: synonym of Botryllus maeandrius (Sluiter, 1898) 
 Botrylloides maeandrius Sluiter, 1898: synonym of Botryllus maeandrius (Sluiter, 1898) 
 Botrylloides magnicoecus Hartmeyer, 1912: synonym of Botrylloides magnicoecum (Hartmeyer, 1912) 
 Botrylloides magnum (Ritter, 1901): synonym of Botryllus magnus Ritter, 1901 
 Botrylloides magnus : synonym of Botryllus magnus Ritter, 1901 
 Botrylloides meandrinum Sluiter: synonym of Botryllus maeandrius (Sluiter, 1898) 
 Botrylloides namei (Hartmeyer & Michaelsen, 1928): synonym of Botryllus planus (Van Name, 1902) 
 Botrylloides niger Herdman, 1886: synonym of Botrylloides nigrum Herdman, 1886 
 Botrylloides parvulum Huitfeld-Kaas, 1896: synonym of Botrylloides leachii (Savigny, 1816) 
 Botrylloides parvulus Huitfeld-Kaas, 1896: synonym of Botrylloides leachii (Savigny, 1816) 
 Botrylloides perspicuum Herdman, 1886: synonym of Botrylloides perspicuus (Herdman, 1886) 
 Botrylloides planus : synonym of Botryllus planus (Van Name, 1902) 
 Botrylloides prostratum Giard, 1872: synonym of Botrylloides leachii (Savigny, 1816) 
 Botrylloides purpureum Herdman, 1886: synonym of Botrylloides leachii (Savigny, 1816) 
 Botrylloides pusilla Alder, 1863: synonym of Botrylloides leachii (Savigny, 1816) 
 Botrylloides radiata Alder & Hancock, 1848: synonym of Botrylloides leachii (Savigny, 1816) 
 Botrylloides ramulosa Alder & Hancock, 1848: synonym of Botrylloides leachii (Savigny, 1816) 
 Botrylloides rotifera Milne Edwards, 1841: synonym of Botrylloides leachii (Savigny, 1816) 
 Botrylloides rubrum Milne Edwards, 1841: synonym of Botrylloides leachii (Savigny, 1816) 
 Botrylloides rugosum Gottschaldt, 1894: synonym of Botrylloides aureum (Sars, 1851) 
 Botrylloides sparsa Alder, 1863: synonym of Botrylloides leachii (Savigny, 1816) 
 Botrylloides translucidum Hartmeyer, 1912: synonym of Botrylloides leachii (Savigny, 1816) 
 Botrylloides vinosa Alder & Hancock, 1912: synonym of Botrylloides leachii (Savigny, 1816) 
 Botrylloides violaceum Oka, 1927: synonym of Botrylloides violaceus Oka, 1927

References

External links
 http://www.exoticsguide.org/species_pages/b_violaceus.html

Stolidobranchia
Tunicate genera
Taxa named by Henri Milne-Edwards